Stewart Christopher Littlewood (7 January 1905 – 2 February 1977) was an English footballer who played as a centre-forward for Holmfield Mission, Hardwich Colliery, Chesterfield, Matlock Town, Sheffield Wednesday, Luton Town, Port Vale, Bournemouth & Boscombe Athletic, and Altrincham.

Career

Early career
Littlewood played for Holmfield Mission and Hardwich Colliery, before he joined of the Chesterfield Third Division North in January 1924. Having failed to make a first-team appearance for the "Spireites", he returned to non-league football with Matlock Town. He gained another chance in the English Football League with Second Division side Sheffield Wednesday in January 1925, but left Hillsborough at the end of the 1924–25 season without featuring in a first-team game. He signed with Luton Town in July 1925 and scored two goals in six Third Division South games, before his release at the end of the 1925–26 season. He had a trial at Alfreton Town in October 1926.

Port Vale
Littlewood signed with Port Vale following a trial period in November 1926. He scored a brace on his debut at Clapton Orient on Christmas Day 1926, but only made one further Second Division appearance in the 1926–27 campaign. He scored 55 in goals in 33 reserve games in the 1927–28 season. However he had to battle out-of-form club legend Wilf Kirkham for a first team place, and was limited to just seven first team games despite scoring a hat-trick past Fulham. He hit nine goals in ten appearances at the start of the 1928–29 campaign, including a hat-trick past Millwall.

Oldham Athletic
Littlewood was transferred to Second Division side Oldham Athletic, in exchange for Albert Pynegar and £1,300, in January 1929. He finished as the "Latics" top-scorer in 1928–29 and 1929–30 with 12 and 30 goals respectively, helping the Boundary Park club to finish just two points off the promotion places in 1929–30.

Return to Port Vale
He was re-signed by new Port Vale manager Tom Morgan for a then-club record fee of £1,550, and scored twice in ten appearances towards the end of the 1930–31 season. He was limited to 13 games in the 1931–32 campaign, scoring five goals. He scored ten goals in 13 games in 1932–33, with his contribution limited after he was forced to undergo surgery to repair cartilage damage on a twisted knee. A club record six of his goals came in one match on 24 September, in a 9–1 thrashing of Chesterfield at The Old Recreation Ground.

Later career
He was transferred to Bournemouth & Boscombe Athletic of the Third Division South in July 1933. Injury restricted him to 18 league games, during which he scored 11 goals, and he was released from Dean Court at the end of the 1933–34 season. He signed with Cheshire County League side Altrincham in July 1934. His injuries left him with restricted mobility, but he still managed to score 100 goals in 111 league and cup appearances. During his three seasons at Moss Lane he scored seven goals in a 9–0 FA Cup win over Moulton Verdon, hit four goals in games against Buxton, Tranmere Rovers Reserves, Nantwich Town and Hyde United, and scored hat-tricks past Ashton National, Prescot Cables, Willaston and Winsford United. After leaving the "Robins", he had one final injury-plagued season with Northwich Victoria.

Style of play
Littlewood was a centre-forward with pace and excellent finishing skills, equally adept with both feet.

Career statistics
Source:

References

1905 births
1977 deaths
Footballers from Rotherham
English footballers
Association football forwards
Chesterfield F.C. players
Matlock Town F.C. players
Sheffield Wednesday F.C. players
Luton Town F.C. players
Port Vale F.C. players
Oldham Athletic A.F.C. players
AFC Bournemouth players
Altrincham F.C. players
Northwich Victoria F.C. players
English Football League players